Gibreel Ali (born 1924) is a Sudanese former sports shooter. He competed in the 50 metre rifle, three positions and 50 metre rifle, prone events at the 1960 Summer Olympics.

References

External links

1924 births
Possibly living people
Sudanese male sport shooters
Olympic shooters of Sudan
Shooters at the 1960 Summer Olympics